Two Mountains (French name: Lac des Deux Montagnes) was an electoral district of the Legislative Assembly of the Province of Canada, Canada East, in a rural area north-west of Montreal.  It was created in 1841, based on the previous electoral district of the same name for the Legislative Assembly of Lower Canada.

Two Mountains was represented by one member in the Legislative Assembly. It was abolished in 1867, upon the creation of Canada and the province of Quebec.

Boundaries 

Two Mountains electoral district was located in a rural area, north-west of Montreal, bordered by the Ottawa River, (now in the area known as the Deux-Montagnes Regional County Municipality).  It was bordered to the south and south-west by the Ottawa River, which was the boundary between Canada East and Canada West.
 
The Union Act, 1840 merged the two provinces of Upper Canada and Lower Canada into the Province of Canada, with a single Parliament.  The separate parliaments of Lower Canada and Upper Canada were abolished.Union Act, 1840, 3 & 4 Vict., c. 35, s. 2.  The Union Act provided that the pre-existing electoral boundaries of Lower Canada and Upper Canada would continue to be used in the new Parliament, unless altered by the Union Act itself.

The Two Mountains electoral district of Lower Canada was not altered by the Act, and therefore continued with the same boundaries which had been set by a statute of Lower Canada in 1829:

Members of the Legislative Assembly 

Two Mountains was represented by one member in the Legislative Assembly. The following were the members for Two Mountains.

Abolition 

The district was abolished on July 1, 1867, when the British North America Act, 1867 came into force, creating Canada and splitting the Province of Canada into Quebec and Ontario.  It was succeeded by electoral districts of the same name in the House of Commons of Canada and the Legislative Assembly of Quebec.

References 

Electoral districts of Canada East